Birgit Schütz (born 8 October 1958 in Brandenburg an der Havel) is a German rower.

References 
 
 

1958 births
Living people
East German female rowers
Sportspeople from Brandenburg an der Havel
Rowers at the 1980 Summer Olympics
Olympic gold medalists for East Germany
Olympic rowers of East Germany
Olympic medalists in rowing
World Rowing Championships medalists for East Germany
Medalists at the 1980 Summer Olympics